Hassan Abdinur Gesey (born 5 May 1998) is a Somali footballer who plays as a midfielder for Gaadiidka and the Somalia national team.

Club career
In 2019, Gesey signed for Horseed after previously playing for Jeenyo United. In 2021, Gesey signed for Gaadiidka.

International career
In April 2015, Gesey was called up for the Somalia under-23 team to play Rwanda U23.

On 22 November 2015, Gesey made his debut for Somalia in a 4–0 loss against Tanzania in the 2015 CECAFA Cup.

References

1998 births
Living people
Association football midfielders
Somalian footballers
Somalia international footballers